Lynette Nixon is an Australian human rights advocate, author, and community leader. A Gunggari woman from south-west Queensland, she is recognised for her advocacy for education, traditional language, reconciliation, health, housing, and legal services for Aboriginal communities.

Advocacy
Nixon was involved in establishing the Aboriginal Housing Company in 1979, serving as president, vice-president, and a committee member for many years. She developed educational resources for Aboriginal studies and introduced a language program into primary schools as a language worker for the Kombumerri Aboriginal Corporation.

Nixon is one of the authors of Binang Goonj – Bridging Cultures in Aboriginal Health, a textbook on improving the education of doctors and nurses on Aboriginal health and cultural competency.

Nixon is the director of the Gunggari Native Title Aboriginal Corporation and the founding member and Gunggari representative on the Northern Basin Aboriginal Nations (NBAN) Committee. She is a storyteller and a cultural keeper of knowledge for the Gunggari people.

Nixon, a founding member of Queensland Murray–Darling Committee's Regional Aboriginal Advisory Group (RAAG), launched the Queensland Murray–Darling Committee 'Reconciliation Action Plan – Innovate' at Goondiwindi in 2018.

Works

Awards
 2008 Queensland Domestic and Family Violence Award "Myalla Booboghun" Big Talking Women
 2018 NAIDOC Awards - Female Elder of the Year

References

Living people
Australian indigenous rights activists
Australian non-fiction writers
Australian women writers
Women human rights activists
Year of birth missing (living people)